The Marshall County Courthouse, at 100 E. Main Street in Madill in Marshall County, Oklahoma, is a historic courthouse built in 1913.  It was listed on the National Register of Historic Places in 1984.

It was designed by architect Jewell Hicks, who also contributed to design of the state capitol.  The building has large pilasters at its corners.

References

External links

Courthouses in Oklahoma
National Register of Historic Places in Marshall County, Oklahoma
Government buildings completed in 1913